Boldklubben Heimdal is a football club situated in Copenhagen, Denmark. Heimdal play their home matches in Fælledparken. The club was a part of the inaugural 1955 Danish Cup tournament.

External links
 Official website
 1955 Danish Cup at Haslund.info

Football clubs in Denmark
1919 establishments in Denmark